Aspin may refer to:
Askal, a Philippine native dog 
Aspin-en-Lavedan, village and commune in the Hautes-Pyrénées, France
Col d'Aspin, the col close to this village
Aspin valve, an automotive component
Les Aspin (1938–1995), U.S. Congressman and Secretary of Defense
Neil Aspin (born 1965), English footballer

See also
Aspen (disambiguation)